Hagin fil Deulacres (Ḥayyim Gedalyah Deulacres) was a 13th-century rabbi who served as the last Presbyter Judaeorum of England prior to the Edict of Expulsion of 1290. A Jew from London, Hagin was appointed to the position on 15 May 1281, through the intercession of Queen Eleanor of Provence. His is not mentioned among the Jewish deportees, and is therefore presumed to have died before the Expulsion.

According to Adolf Neubauer, Hagin may have translated into French Abraham ibn Ezra's astrological work Reshit ḥokhma ('The Beginning of Wisdom') in 1273, as well as the Image du monde of Gautier de Metz.

Notes

References
 

13th-century English rabbis
Rabbis from London